Tri-Valley Conference is the name of several school athletic conferences in the United States:
 Tri-Valley Conference (Kansas)
 Tri-Valley Conference (Michigan)
 Tri-Valley Conference (Minnesota) (Disbanded in 2002)
 Tri-Valley Conference (Ohio)
 Tri-Valley Conference (Oregon)